Rich Shanko (born January 11, 1960) is an American former weightlifter. He competed in the men's heavyweight I event at the 1984 Summer Olympics.

References

External links
 

1960 births
Living people
American male weightlifters
Olympic weightlifters of the United States
Weightlifters at the 1984 Summer Olympics
Sportspeople from New Brunswick, New Jersey
20th-century American people
21st-century American people